Fosco Becattini (16 March 1925 – 14 December 2016) was an Italian football player and manager, who played as a defender.

Club career
Becattini played for 12 seasons in the Serie A with Genoa C.F.C. (338 games, 1 goal). He has the second-most appearances for Genoa C.F.C. with 425.

International career
Becattini made his debut for the Italy national football team on 27 March 1949 in a 3–1 away win against Spain. He made one more appearance for Italy in the same year.

Death
Becattini died in December 2016 at the age of 91.

References

External links
 

1925 births
2016 deaths
Italian footballers
Italy international footballers
Serie A players
Serie B players
Genoa C.F.C. players
Association football defenders